This is an A–Z list of jazz standards. It is intended to be as comprehensive a list as possible, including those pop standards and film song classics which have been sung or performed in jazz on numerous occasions and are considered part of the jazz repertoire. For a chronological list of jazz standards with author details, see the lists in the box on the right. Entries in italics are alternative titles for songs that appear elsewhere on the list. Songs are listed alphabetically, omitting any articles such as "the".

0–9
12th Street Rag
26-2
42nd Street
500 Miles High
502 Blues
52nd Street Theme
9:20 Special

A

A-Tisket, A-Tasket
"A" Train (see Take the "A" Train)
Ablution
About a Quarter to Nine 
Ace in the Hole
Accent on Youth
Ac-Cent-Tchu-Ate the Positive
Across the Alley from the Alamo
Adieu Tristesse (orig. A Felicidade)
Affirmation
African Flower
After You, Who?
An Affair to Remember (Our Love Affair)
Afro Blue
After Hours
After I Say I'm Sorry (orig. What Can I Say After...)
After You've Gone
Afternoon in Paris
Água de Beber
Águas de Março (a.k.a. Waters of March)
(Ah, the Apple Trees) When the World Was Young
Ah-Leu-Cha
Ain't Got Nothin' But the Blues
Ain't Misbehavin'
Ain't No Use
Ain't That a Kick in the Head?
Ain't Nobody's Business
Ain't She Sweet
Air Mail Special
Ain't We Got Fun?
Airegin
Alabamy Bound
Alexander's Ragtime Band
Alfie
Algo Bueno (a.k.a. Woody 'n' You)
Alice in Wonderland
All Alone
All Blues
All by Myself
All God's Chillun Got Rhythm
All I Do Is Dream of You
All in Love is Fair
All My Life
All My Tomorrows
All of Me
All of You
All or Nothing at All
All the Clouds'll Roll Away (orig. Liza (All the Clouds'll Roll Away))
All the Things You Are
All the Way
All Through the Night
All Too Soon
Allen's Alley
Almost Blue
Almost Like Being in Love
Alone
Alone Together
Alright, Okay, You Win
Always
Always True to You in My Fashion
Am I Blue?
Amazing Grace
American Patrol
Amor
And Her Tears Flowed Like Wine
And I Love Her
And So It Goes
And the Angels Sing
Angel Eyes
Another Star
Anthropology
Any Place I Hang My Hat Is Home
Anything for You
Anything Goes
April in Paris
Aquarela do Brasil
Aquarius
Aquellos Ojos Verdes (a.k.a. Green Eyes)
Aren't You Glad You're You?
Are You Havin' Any Fun?
Around the World
As Long as He Needs Me
As Long as I Live
As Time Goes By
Ask Me Now
At Last
At Long Last Love
At Sundown
(At the) Darktown Strutters' Ball
At the Jazz Band Ball
Au Privave
Auld Lang Syne
Aunt Hagar's Blues
Autumn in New York
Autumn Leaves
Avalon
Azure

B

Baby Dear
Baby Face
Baby, It's Cold Outside
Baby Won't You Please Come Home
Back Home Again in Indiana
Back in Your Own Backyard
Back Water Blues
Bad and the Beautiful
Bags' Groove
Bahia
(The Ballad of) Mack the Knife
Ballin' the Jack
Baltimore Oriole
Barbados
Basin Street Blues
Baubles, Bangles and Beads
Be a Clown
Be Careful, It's My Heart
Be My Love
Beale Street Blues
Beat Me Daddy, Eight to the Bar
Beautiful Black Eyes
Beautiful Love
Beatrice
Beauty and the Beast
Bebop in Pastel (a.k.a. Bouncing with Bud)
Because of You
Begin the Beguine
Bei Mir Bistu Shein (a.k.a. Bei Mir Bist Du Schoen)
Bemsha Swing
Bernie's Tune
Besame Mucho
Bess, You Is My Woman Now
Bessie's Blues
The Best Is Yet to Come
The Best Thing for You (Would Be Me)
The Best Things in Life Are Free
Best Wishes
Between the Devil and the Deep Blue Sea
Bewitched, Bothered, and Bewildered
Beyond the Sea
Bidin' My Time
Big Butter and Egg Man
Big Foot
Big Noise From Winnetka
Big Nick
Big Spender
Bill
Bill Bailey, Won't You Please Come Home
Billie's Bounce
Birdland
Birks' Works
The Birth of the Blues
Black and Blue
Black and Tan Fantasy
Black Coffee
Black Narcissus
Black Nile
Black Orpheus
Blame It on My Youth
Blood Count
Bloomdido
A Blossom Fell
Blue and Sentimental
Blue Bossa
Blue Devil Blues
Blue in Green
Blue Lou
Blue Monk
Blue Moon
Blue 'n' Boogie
Blue Rondo à la Turk
Blue Room
Blue Skies
Blue Train
Blue Turning Grey Over You
Blueberry Hill
Blues for Alice
Blues in My Heart
Blues in the Closet
Blues in the Night
Bluesette
Body and Soul
Bohemia After Dark
Bolivar Blues
Bolivia
Boplicity
Born to Be Blue
Bouncing with Bud
Brazil (orig. Aquarela do Brasil)
The Breeze and I
Bright Size Life
Broadway
Broadway Blues
Bugle Call Rag
But Beautiful
But Not for Me
By Myself
By the Light of the Silvery Moon
Bye, Bye, Baby (Baby Goodbye)
Bye Bye Blackbird
Bye Bye Blues

C

C Jam Blues
Ça, c'est l'amour
Cabin in the Sky
Cakewalk
Call Me Irresponsible
Canadian Sunset
Candy
Can't Help Lovin' Dat Man (resp. ...Gal)
Can't We Be Friends
Cantaloupe Island
Caravan
Careless Love
Carioca
Carolina in the Morning
Cast Your Fate to the Wind
C.C. Rider (see See See Rider)
C'est Magnifique
C'est si bon
Centerpiece
Central Park West
Ceora
Chameleon
Change of Season
Change Partners
Charade
Charleston
Chasin' the Bird
Chattanooga Choo Choo
Cheek to Cheek
Chega de Saudade
Chelsea Bridge
Cherokee
Cherry
Cherry Pink and Apple Blossom White
Cheryl
Chicago (That Toddlin' Town)
A Child Is Born
Children of the Night
China Boy
Chinatown My Chinatown
Chippie
Chitlins con Carne
Chlo-e
The Christmas Song
Christmas Time Is Here
Christopher Columbus
Chuva Delicada (orig. of The Gentle Rain)
Cielito Lindo
Clarinet Marmalade
Close Enough for Love
Close Your Eyes
Cocktails for Two
Cold, Cold Heart
Come Dance with Me
Come Fly with Me
Come Rain or Come Shine
Come Sunday
Comes Love
Con Alma
Conception
Confessin'
Confirmation
The Continental
Copenhagen
Coquette
Corcovado (Quiet Nights of Quiet Stars)
Corner Pocket
A Cottage for Sale
Cotton Tail
Countdown
Crazy He Calls Me
Crazy Rhythm
Creole Love Call
Cry Me a River
Crystal Silence

D

Daahoud
Dancing in the Dark
Dancing on the Ceiling
Danny Boy
Dark Eyes
Darktown Strutters' Ball
Darn That Dream
Davenport Blues
Day by Day
Day Dream
Day In, Day Out
Days of Wine and Roses
Dear Heart
Dear Old Southland
Dear Old Stockholm
'Deed I Do
Deep in a Dream
Deep Night
Deep Purple
Deep River
Desafinado
Detour Ahead
Dexterity
Diamonds Are a Girl's Best Friend
Dinah
Dindi
Ding-Dong! The Witch Is Dead
Dipper Mouth Blues
Dixieland
Dizzy Atmosphere
Dizzy's Business
Django
Do I Love You?
Do It Again
Do Nothin' Till You Hear from Me
Do You Know What It Means to Miss New Orleans
Doctor, Lawyer, Indian Chief
Doggin' Around
Dolphin Dance
Donna Lee
Don't Blame Me
Don't Bring Lulu
Don't Explain
Don't Fence Me In
Don't Get Around Much Anymore
Don't Go to Strangers
Don't Take Your Love from Me
Don't Worry 'Bout Me
Doodlin'
Down by the Riverside
Down in the Depths (On the Ninetieth Floor)
Down with Love (song)
Doxy
Dream
Dream a Little Dream of Me
Dream Dancing
Dreamsville
Drifting on a Reed
Drop Me Off in Harlem
Drum Boogie
Duke's Place (see C Jam Blues)

E

Early Autumn
East of the Sun (and West of the Moon)
Easter Parade
Easy Living
Easy to Love (short for You'd Be So Easy to Love
Echoes of Harlem
Elmer's Tune
Embraceable You
Emily
Epistrophy
Equipoise
Equinox
E.S.P
Estate
Every Day I Have the Blues
Everybody Loves My Baby
Everything but You
Everything Happens to Me
Everything I Have Is Yours
Everything Must Change
Evidence
Ev'ry Time We Say Goodbye
Exactly Like You
Exodus

F

Falling in Love with Love
Farewell Blues
Fascinating Rhythm
Fat Girl
Fee-Fi-Fo-Fum
Feeling Good
A Felicidade
Fever
Fidgety Feet
Fine and Dandy
Fine and Mellow
A Fine Romance
Fire Waltz
Five Foot Two, Eyes of Blue (a.k.a. Has Anybody Seen My Gal?)
Flamingo
The Flat Foot Floogie
A Flower Is a Lovesome Thing
Fly Me to the Moon
Flying Home
A Foggy Day (In London Town)
The Folks Who Live on the Hill
Fools Rush In (Where Angels Fear to Tread)
Footprints
For All We Know
For Once in My Life
(I Love You) For Sentimental Reasons
For You
Forest Flower
Four
Four Brothers
Frankie and Johnny
Freddie Freeloader
Freedom Jazz Dance
Frenesí
The Frim-Fram Sauce
From This Moment On
Full House

G

A Gal in Calico
Gee, Baby, Ain't I Good to You
The Gentle Rain
Georgia on My Mind
Get Happy
Get Me to the Church on Time
Get Out of Town
(Get Your Kicks on) Route 66
Giant Steps
The Girl from Ipanema
The Girl That I Marry
Girl Talk
Give Me the Simple Life
Glad to Be Unhappy
Gloomy Sunday
The Glory of Love
God Bless the Child
God Rest Ye, Merry Gentlemen
Goin' Out of My Head
Golden Lady
Gone with the Wind
Good Bait
Goody Goody
The Good Life
Good Morning Heartache
Goodbye
Goodbye Pork Pie Hat
Goodnight My Love
Grandpa's Spells
Green Eyes (Aquellos Ojos Verdes)
Greensleeves
Groovin' High
Guilty
Gut Stomp
The Gypsy in My Soul

H

Haitian Fight Song
Half Nelson
Hallelujah!
Hallelujah I Love Her So
Happiness Is a Thing Called Joe
Hard Hearted Hannah (The Vamp of Savannah)
Harlem Nocturne
Has Anybody Seen My Gal?
Haunted Heart
Have You Heard?
Have You Met Miss Jones?
Have Yourself a Merry Little Christmas
Heart and Soul
Heat Wave
Heaven Watch the Philippines
Heebie Jeebies
Hello, Dolly!
Hello, My Lover, Goodbye
Hello, Young Lovers
Here in My Heart
Here's That Rainy Day
He's Funny That Way (orig. She's...)
Hi-Fly
High Society
Hit the Road to Dreamland
Honeysuckle Rose
Hong Kong Blues
Hooray for Love
Hot House
Hot Toddy
A House Is Not a Home
How About Me?
How About You?
How Come You Do Me Like You Do?
How Deep Is the Ocean?
How Do You Keep the Music Playing?
How High the Moon
How Insensitive (orig. Insensatez)
How Little We Know
How Long Blues
How Long Has This Been Going On?
How My Heart Sings
Humoresque
A Hundred Years from Today

I

I Ain't Got Nobody
I Ain't Got Nothin' But the Blues
I Believe in You
I Can't Believe That You're in Love with Me
I Can't Escape from You
I Can't Get Started
I Can't Give You Anything but Love
I Can't Stop Loving You
I Concentrate on You
I Could Go On Singing
I Could Have Danced All Night
I Could Write a Book
I Cover the Waterfront
I Cried for You
I Didn't Know About You
I Didn't Know What Time It Was
I Don't Know Why (I Love You Like I Do)
I Don't Stand a Ghost of a Chance with You
I Don't Want to Walk Without You
I Don't Want You to Go
I Dreamed a Dream
I Fall in Love Too Easily
I Found a New Baby
I Get a Kick Out of You
I Get Along Without You Very Well
I Got a Crush on You
I Got It Bad (and That Ain't Good)
I Got Lost in His Arms
I Got Rhythm
I Gotta Right to Sing the Blues
I Guess I'll Hang My Tears Out to Dry
I Guess I'll Have to Change My Plan
I Hadn't Anyone Till You
I Happen to Like New York
I Have Dreamed
I Hear a Rhapsody
I Hear Music
I Left My Heart in San Francisco
I Let a Song Go Out of My Heart
I Love Paris
I Love You
(I Love You) For Sentimental Reasons
I Loves You, Porgy
I Married an Angel
I Mean You
I Only Have Eyes for You
I Remember Clifford
I Remember You
I See Your Face Before Me
I Should Care
I Surrender Dear
I Thought About You
I Wanna Be Loved
I Want to Be Happy
I Wish I Could Shimmy Like My Sister Kate
I Wish I Knew How It Would Feel to Be Free
I Wish I Were in Love Again
I Wish You Love
I Won't Dance
(I'd Like to Get You on a) Slow Boat to China
If I Could Be with You (One Hour Tonight)
If I Had You
If I Loved You
If I Only Had a Brain
If I Should Lose You
If I Were a Bell
If Love Were All
If My Friends Could See Me Now
If You Are But a Dream
If You Could See Me Now
If You Never Come Home to Me (orig. Inútil Paisagem)
I'll Be Hard to Handle
I'll Be Seeing You
I'll Get By (As Long as I Have You)
I'll Never Be the Same
I'll Never Smile Again
I'll Remember April
I'll See You Again
I'll Take Romance
Ill Wind
I'm a Fool to Want You
I'm Beginning to See the Light
(I'm) Confessin' (that I Love You)
I'm Coming Virginia
I'm Getting Sentimental Over You
I'm Glad There Is You
I'm Gonna Lock My Heart (And Throw Away the Key)
I'm in the Mood for Love
I'm Just a Lucky So-and-So
I'm Lost
I'm Old Fashioned
I'm Putting All My Eggs in One Basket
I'm Sitting on Top of the World
Imagination
Impressions
In a Mellow Tone
In a Mist
In a Sentimental Mood
(In My) Solitude
In the Arms of Love
In the Blue of Evening
In the Cool, Cool, Cool of the Evening
In the Groove
In the Mood
In the Still of the Night
In the Wee Small Hours of the Morning
In Walked Bud
In Your Own Sweet Way
The Inch Worm
Inner Urge
Insensatez
Interplay
Inútil Paisagem
Invitation
Is You Is or Is You Ain't My Baby
Isfahan
Isn't It a Pity?
Isn't It Romantic?
Isn't This a Lovely Day?
Israel
It All Depends on You
It Could Happen to You
It Don't Mean a Thing
It Had Better Be Tonight (orig. Meglio stasera)
It Had to Be You
It Happened in Monterey
It Might as Well Be Spring
It Never Entered My Mind
It Was Written in the Stars
It's All Right with Me
It's Been a Long, Long Time
It's a Big, Wide, Wonderful World
It's Easy to Remember (And So Hard to Forget)
It's Magic
It's Only a Paper Moon
It's the Talk of the Town
I've Found a New Baby
I've Got a Crush on You
I've Got a Gal in Kalamazoo
I've Got My Love to Keep Me Warm
I Gotta Right to Sing the Blues
I've Got the World on a String
I've Got You Under My Skin
I've Grown Accustomed to Her Face

J

Ja-Da
J'attendrai
Jeepers Creepers
Jersey Bounce
Jim
Jingle Bells
Jitterbug Waltz
Jive at Five
Johnny Come Lately
Jordu
Jukebox Saturday Night
Jump, Jive an' Wail
Jump Monk
Jumpin' at the Woodside
June in January
Just a Closer Walk with Thee
Just a Gigolo
Just A-Sittin' and A-Rockin'
Just Friends
Just in Time
Just One of Those Things
Just Squeeze Me (But Please Don't Tease Me)
Just You, Just Me

K

Kansas City
Kansas City Stomp
Keep Off the Grass
Killer Joe
King Porter Stomp
A Kiss to Build a Dream On
Ko-Ko
Kogun

L

(Oh,) Lady Be Good
Lady Bird
The Lady Is a Tramp
The Lady's in Love with You
Lady Sings the Blues
The Lamp Is Low
Last Night When We Were Young
The Last Time I Saw Paris
Laura
Lazy Bird
Lazybones
Lazy River
Learnin' the Blues
Lester Leaps In
Let It Be
Let It Snow
Let There Be Love
Let's Call the Whole Thing Off
Let's Face the Music and Dance
Let's Fall in Love
Let's Get Away from It All
Let's Have Another Cup of Coffee
Let's Misbehave
Let's Take a Walk Around the Block
Like Someone in Love
Li'l Darlin'
Li'l Liza Jane
Limehouse Blues
Linus and Lucy
Litha
Little Girl Blue
Little White Lies
Liza (All the Clouds'll Roll Away)
Lonely Woman
Lonesome Road
Long Ago (and Far Away)
Lonnie's Lament
Look for the Silver Lining
The Look of Love
Look to the Sky
Lorelei
Lost in the Stars
Louise
Love Dance
Love for Sale
Love Is Here to Stay
Love Is Just Around the Corner
Love Is the Sweetest Thing
Love Letters
Love Me or Leave Me
Love Theme from Spartacus
Love Theme from The Sandpiper
Love Walked In
Loveless Love
Lover
Lover, Come Back to Me
Lover Man (Oh, Where Can You Be?)
Luck Be a Lady
Lujon
Lullaby of Birdland
Lullaby of the Leaves
Lulu's Back in Town
Lush Life
Lydia the Tattooed Lady

M

Mack the Knife
Maiden Voyage
Main Stem
Magic Moments
Make Believe
Make Someone Happy
Makin' Whoopee
A Man and a Woman
The Man I Love
The Man That Got Away
Manhã de Carnaval
Manhattan
El Manisero (a.k.a. The Peanut Vendor)
Manteca
Maple Leaf Rag
Margie
Maria
Marie
Mas Que Nada
Maybe
Maybe You'll Be There
Mean to Me
Meaning of the Blues
Meditation
Me and My Shadow
Meet The Flintstones
Meglio stasera
Memories of Tomorrow
Memories of You
The Memphis Blues
Mercy, Mercy, Mercy
Michelle
Midnight Sun
Midnight Symphony
Milestones
Minority
Minor Swing
Miss Ann
Miss Brown to You
Mississippi Mud
Misterioso
Misty
Moanin'
Moanin' Low
Moments Like This
Moment's Notice
Mon Homme
Mona Lisa
Monk's Dream
The Mooche
Mood Indigo
Moody's Mood for Love
Moonburn
Moon Dreams
Moon River
Moon Song (That Wasn't Meant for Me)
Moondance
Moonglow
Moonlight Becomes You
Moonlight in Vermont
Moonlight Serenade
Moose the Mooche
More
The More I See You
More Than You Know
Die Moritat von Mackie Messer (a.k.a. Mack the Knife)
Morning
Morning Dance
The Most Beautiful Girl in the World
Moten Swing
Motherless Child
Mountain Greenery
Move
Mr. Bojangles
Mr. P.C.
Muskrat Ramble
My Baby Just Cares for Me
My Blue Heaven
My Buddy
My Darling, My Darling
My Favorite Things
My Foolish Heart
My Funny Valentine
My Heart Belongs to Daddy
My Heart Stood Still
My Mammy
My Man (orig. Mon Homme)
My Man's Gone Now
My Melancholy Baby
My Old Flame
My One and Only Love
My Reverie
My Resistance Is Low
My Romance
My Shining Hour
My Ship
My Way
Mysterious Traveller

N

Nagasaki
Naima
Nancy (With the Laughing Face)
Nardis
Nature Boy
Near You
Nefertiti
The Nearness of You
Nem Um Talvez
Never My Love
Never Will I Marry
Nevertheless (I'm in Love with You)
New Orleans
Nica's Dream
Nice 'n' Easy
Nice Work If You Can Get It
Night and Day
The Night Has a Thousand Eyes
A Night in Tunisia
Night Train
A Nightingale Sang in Berkeley Square
No Other Love
No Moon at All
No More Blues (orig. Chega de Saudade)
Nobody Else But Me
Nobody Knows You When You're Down and Out
Nobody's Sweetheart Now
Nostalgia in Times Square
Now It Can Be Told
Now's the Time
Nuages

O

An Occasional Man
Of Thee I Sing
Oh, Christmas Tree
Oh, Lady Be Good!
Oh, You Crazy Moon
Ol' Man River
Old Devil Moon
Old Folks
Old Folks at Home
Ole Buttermilk Sky
Oleo
On a Clear Day (You Can See Forever)
On Green Dolphin Street
On the Alamo
On the Street Where You Live
On the Sunny Side of the Street
Once I Loved
Once in a While
One Morning in May
One Note Samba
One O'Clock Jump
Only Trust Your Heart
Oop Bop Sh'Bam
Opus de Funk
Orange Colored Sky
Organ Grinder's Swing
Ornithology
Our Delight
(Our) Love Is Here to Stay
Out of Nowhere
Out of This World
Over the Rainbow

P

Panama
Pannonica
Papa Loves Mambo
Paper Doll
A Paper Moon
Parisian Thoroughfare
Parker's Mood
The Party's Over
Passion Dance
Peace
Peace Piece
The Peacocks
The Peanut Vendor
Peel Me a Grape
Peg O' My Heart
Pennies from Heaven
Pennsylvania 6-5000
A Penny for Your Thoughts
Pensativa
Pent-Up House
Penthouse Serenade
People
People Will Say We're in Love
Perdido
Perfidia
Peter Gunn
Petite Fleur
Pick Yourself Up
Pinetop's Boogie Woogie
The Pink Panther Theme
Please Be Kind
(Please) Do It Again
Please Don't Talk About Me When I'm Gone
Please Send Me Someone to Love
Poinciana
Polka Dots and Moonbeams
Ponta de Areia
Poor Butterfly
Potato Head Blues
The Preacher
Prelude to a Kiss
Prisoner of Love
P.S. I Love You
Put Your Dreams Away (For Another Day)
Puttin' On the Ritz

Q
Que reste-t-il de nos amours ?
Que Sera, Sera (Whatever Will Be, Will Be)
Quicksilver
¿Quién será? (a.k.a. Sway)
Quiet Nights of Quiet Stars (orig. Corcovado)
Quiet Now
Quizás, Quizás, Quizás

R

Recorda Me
Red Sails in the Sunset
Reflections
Reincarnation of a Lovebird
Relaxin' at Camarillo
Remember
Rhythm-A-Ning
Ridin’ High
River Man
Riverboat Shuffle
Road Song
Rock-a-Bye Your Baby with a Dixie Melody
Rockin' Chair
Rockin' in Rhythm
Rocks in My Bed
Rose Room
'Round Midnight
Route 66
Royal Garden Blues
Ruby
Ruby, My Dear
Rudolph the Red-Nosed Reindeer
Runnin' Wild
Russian Lullaby

S

 The Saga of Harrison Crabfeathers
 Saint Louis Blues
 Salt Peanuts
 Samba de Uma Nota Só (a.k.a. One Note Samba)
 Santa Claus Is Coming to Town
 Satin Doll
 Saturday Night (Is the Loneliest Night of the Week)
 Say It Isn't So
 Say It with Music
 Scotch and Soda
 Scrapple from the Apple
 The Second Time Around
 Secret Love
 See See Rider (a.k.a. C.C. Rider)
 Send a Little Love My Way
 Send in the Clowns
 Señor Blues
Sentimental Journey
 Sentimental Me
 September in the Rain
 The September of My Years
 September Song
 Serenade in Blue
 Serenata
 Seven Steps to Heaven
 The Shadow of Your Smile
 Shanghai Shuffle
 The Sheik of Araby
 She Didn't Say Yes
 She's Funny That Way
 Shine
 Shine on Harvest Moon
 Shiny Stockings
 A Ship Without a Sail
 Shoo-Fly Pie and Apple Pan Dowdy
 The Sidewinder
 Signing Off
 Silent Night
 Since I Fell for You
 Sing for Your Supper
 Sing My Heart
 Sing, Sing, Sing (With a Swing)
 Sing, You Sinners
 Singin' in the Rain
 Sister Sadie
 Skylark
 Sleep Warm
 A Sleepin' Bee
 Sleepy Time Down South
 (I'd Like to Get You on a) Slow Boat to China
 Smile
 Smoke Gets in Your Eyes
 Snake Rag
 Snuggled on Your Shoulder (Cuddled in Your Arms)
 So Nice (a.k.a. Summer Samba)
 So Rare
 So What
 Soft Lights and Sweet Music
 Soft Winds
 Softly, as I Leave You
 Softly, as in a Morning Sunrise
 Solar
 Solitude
 Some of These Days
 Some Other Spring
 Some Skunk Funk
 Somebody Loves Me
 Somebody Loves You
 Somebody Stole My Gal
 Someday My Prince Will Come
 Someday Sweetheart
 Someday (You'll Want Me to Want You)
 Someone to Light Up My Life
 Someone to Watch Over Me
 Something Cool
 Something to Live For
 Sometimes I Feel Like a Motherless Child
 Sometimes I'm Happy (Sometimes I'm Blue)
 Somewhere Along the Way
 Somewhere Over the Rainbow
 Song for My Father
 A Song for You
 The Song Is Ended
 The Song Is You
 Song of India
 Song of the Tree
 Sonny Boy
 Soon
 Sophisticated Lady
 The Sorcerer
 Soul Eyes
 South
 Spain
 Speak Low
 The Sphinx
 Spring Can Really Hang You Up the Most
 Spring Is Here
 Spring Will Be a Little Late This Year
 Squeeze Me
 St. James Infirmary Blues
 St. Thomas
 Stablemates
 Stairway to the Stars
 Star Eyes
 Stardust
 Stars Fell on Alabama
 Stella by Starlight
 Steppin' Out with My Baby
 Stolen Moments
 Stompin' at the Savoy
 Stormy Monday Blues
 Stormy Weather
 Straight, No Chaser
 Straighten Up and Fly Right
 Strange Fruit
 Stranger in Paradise
 Strangers in the Night
 Strasbourg / St. Denis
 Street of Dreams
 Strike Up the Band
 A String of Pearls
 Strollin'
 (Darktown) Strutters' Ball
 Struttin' with Some Barbecue
 Sugar
 Sugar Blues
 The Summer Knows
 Summertime
Summer Wind
 Sunday
 A Sunday Kind of Love
 Sunny
 Superstition
 Surfboard
 The Surrey with the Fringe on Top
 Swanee River
 Sway
 Swedish Pastry
 Sweet and Lovely
 Sweet Georgia Brown
 Sweet Lorraine
 Sweet Sue, Just You
 Sweethearts on Parade
 Swing 42
 Swing Low, Sweet Chariot
 Swinging on a Star
 Swingmatism
 'S Wonderful

T

'Tain't Nobody's Biz-ness If I Do
Take Five
Take the "A" Train
Taking a Chance on Love
Tangerine
Tar Paper Stomp
A Taste of Honey
Tea for Two
Teach Me Tonight
Ten Cents a Dance
Tenderly
Tenor Madness
Thank Heaven for Little Girls
Thanks for the Memory
That Old Black Magic
That Old Feeling
That's a Plenty
That's All
That's Amore
That's Life
That's Why They Call Me Shine
Them There Eyes
There Is No Greater Love
There! I've Said It Again
There Must Be Somebody Else
There Will Never Be Another You
There'll Be Some Changes Made
There's a Lull in My Life
There's a Small Hotel
There's No Such Thing As Love
There's No You
These Foolish Things (Remind Me of You)
They All Laughed
They Can't Take That Away from Me
They Didn't Believe Me
(They Long to Be) Close to You
They Say
They Say It's Wonderful
Things Ain't What They Used to Be
The Things We Did Last Summer
This Can't Be Love
This Could Be The Start Of Something Big
This I Dig Of You
This Is All I Ask
This Love of Mine
This Masquerade
This Time the Dream's on Me
Thou Swell
Three Coins in the Fountain
Three Flowers
Three Little Words 
Tico Tico
Tiger Rag
Till There Was You
Time After Time
Time on My Hands
Time Remembered
Tin Roof Blues
Tin Tin Deo
'Tis Autumn
To Each His Own
To Keep My Love Alive
To Love Somebody
Tones for Joan's Bones
Too Close for Comfort
Too Darn Hot
Too Good to Be True
Too Marvelous for Words
Topsy
The Touch of Your Lips
Triste
The Trolley Song
Try a Little Tenderness
Tune Up
Turn Out the Stars
Tuxedo Junction
The Two Lonely People
Two Sleepy People

U
Undecided
Under a Blanket of Blue
Unsquare Dance
Until the Real Thing Comes Along
(Up a) Lazy River
Useless Landscape (orig. Inútil Paisagem)

V
Vaya con Dios
The Very Thought of You
La Vie en rose
Violets for Your Furs
Viper's Drag
Vou Te Contar (a.k.a. Wave)
Volare

W

Wabash Blues
Wait till You See Her
Walkin' Shoes
Walk On By
Waltz for Debby
Washboard Blues
Watch What Happens
Watermelon Man
Waters of March (orig. Águas de Março)
Wave (a.k.a. Vou Te Contar)
Way Down Yonder in New Orleans
The Way You Look Tonight
Weary Blues
Weed Smoker's Dream (a.k.a. Why Don't You Do Right?)
We'll Be Together Again
We'll Meet Again
Well, You Needn't
West Coast Blues
West End Blues
What a Diff'rence a Day Made
What a Little Moonlight Can Do
What a Wonderful World
What Are You Doing the Rest of Your Life?
What Can I Say After I Say I'm Sorry?
What Is There to Say?
What Is This Thing Called Love?
What Kind of Fool Am I?
What the World Needs Now Is Love
What Now My Love
Whatever Lola Wants
What'll I Do
What's New?
When I Fall in Love
When It's Sleepy Time Down South
When My Sugar Walks Down the Street
When Sunny Gets Blue
When the Saints Go Marching In
When the Sun Comes Out
When You Wish Upon a Star
When Your Lover Has Gone
When You're Smiling
Where Are You?
Where or When
Whiplash
Whispering
Whisper Not
Whistle While You Work
Who Can I Turn To?
Who’s Sorry Now?
Why Can't You Behave?
Why Don't You Do Right?
Why Was I Born?
Wild Women Don't Have the Blues
Will You Still Be Mine?
Willow Weep for Me
Windows
Witchcraft
Without a Song
Wives and Lovers
Wolverine Blues
Won't You Come Home Bill Bailey
Woodchopper's Ball
The Woodpecker Song
Woody 'n' You
Work Song
The World Is Waiting for the Sunrise
Wrap Your Troubles in Dreams

Y

Yardbird Suite
Yellow Days
Yes Sir, That's My Baby
Yesterdays
You and the Night and the Music
You Are Too Beautiful
You Belong to Me
You Brought a New Kind of Love to Me
You Can Depend on Me
You Couldn't Be Cuter
You Don't Know What Love Is
You Go to My Head
You Make Me Feel So Young
You Must Have Been a Beautiful Baby
You Send Me
You Stepped Out of a Dream
You Took Advantage of Me
You Won't Be Satisfied (Until You Break My Heart)
You'd Be So Easy to Love
You'd Be So Nice to Come Home To
Young and Foolish
Young at Heart
You're Driving Me Crazy
You're Getting to Be a Habit with Me
You're Just in Love
You're My Everything
You're My Thrill
You're Nobody till Somebody Loves You 
You're the Cream in My Coffee
You're the Top
You've Changed
You've Got What Gets Me

Z
Zing! Went the Strings of My Heart
Zip-a-Dee-Doo-Dah

References
 Jazzstandards.com
 Gioia, Ted. The Jazz Standards: A Guide to the Repertoire. Oxford University Press, 2012.

External links
Learnjazzstandards.com
Hal Leonard list of standards (includes jazz and other genres)
Secondhandsongs.com, search for jazz standards and find a comprehensive list of covers
The Jazz Standards Progressions Analyzed, Jazz Standards Progressions Analyzed, including chord-by-chord harmonic analysis, chord-scales and arrows & brackets analysis

Jazz standards
Jazz
Standards